is a form of ikebana.

History 
The origins go back to Buddhist offerings of flowers, which are placed upright in vases. This  style was established in the Muromachi period (1333–1568).

It enjoyed a revival in the 17th century, and was used as a decorative technique for ceremonial and festive occasions.

One of the  proponents was Senkei Ikenobō . The essence of the direction of the rite was clarified by Sen'ō Ikenobō (1482–1543) in the manuscript . Today it is still practiced by the Ikenobō school of flower arranging.

 later developed into a less-formal style. It was eventually supplanted by the shōka style, which had a classical appearance but was asymmetrical in structure.

The Saga Go-ryū  school has Buddhist roots and the style of floral offerings at the altar follows similar rules and is called .

Characteristics 
The  style reflects the magnificence of nature and its display. For example, pine branches symbolize endurance and eternity, and yellow chrysanthemums symbolizes life. Trees can symbolise mountains, while grasses and flowers can suggest water. Until 1700, the arrangement consisted of seven main lines, and roughly starting in 1800, it consisted of nine main lines, each of which supports other minor lines. Editing in that style can only be done through regular and long-term practice. The main axis, often the branch, is predominantly perpendicular, often the axis is formed by pine branches and is the most distinctive element of the arrangement. Both other lines are arranged at the bottom. The editing centre is filled like a bouquet of flowers.

-style arrangements were also used for festive events and exhibitions.

 builds on the basics of traditional aesthetics of  direction. It is used by seven or nine lines when creating a pattern. The arrangement is to be varied and expresses the diversity of nature, which is very characteristic for this direction.

 was introduced in 1999. Its characteristics lie in the arrangement of lines that create nine to eleven branches or stems and the essence lies above all in balance, harmony, perspective and movement, although it follows the  style. It is not important to follow the rule of only three plant materials. Exotic plant material is used as well as classical plants (salvia, pine).

Gallery

See also
Moribana

References

External links 

Ikebana